The Titovka is a river in the north of the Kola Peninsula in Murmansk Oblast, Russia. The Titovka originates in the lake Koshkayavr and flows into the Motovsky Gulf of Barents Sea. Its biggest tributary is the Valasyoki.

References

Rivers of Murmansk Oblast
Drainage basins of the Barents Sea